The Jarmo Wasama Memorial Trophy is an ice hockey award given by the Finnish Liiga to the best rookie of the season. The trophy is named in honor of Jarmo Wasama, a young Finnish defenseman who was killed in an automobile accident in 1966. In 2020 it was awarded to Matias Maccelli of Ilves.

Winners 
1971-72: Seppo Ahokainen (Ilves)

1972-73: Jukka Alkula (Tappara)

1973-74: Matti Hagman (HIFK)

1974-75: Markus Mattsson (Ilves)

1975-76: Kari Makkonen (Ässät)

1976-77: Risto Siltanen (Ilves)

1977-78: Markku Kiimalainen (Kärpät)

1978-79: Kari Jalonen (Kärpät)

1979-80: Pekka Arbelius (Kärpät)

1980-81: Petri Skriko (SaiPa)

1981-82: Hannu Virta (TPS)

1982-83: Jukka Tammi (Ilves)

1983-84: Joel Paunio (HIFK)

1984-85: Jari Neuvonen (Ilves)

1985-86: Risto Kurkinen (JYP)

1986-87: Janne Ojanen (Tappara)

1987-88: Mika Nieminen (Ilves)

1988-89: Pekka Peltola (HPK)

1989-90: Vesa Viitakoski (SaiPa)

1990-91: Janne Grönvall (Tappara)

1991-92: Petri Varis (Ässät)

1992-93: Ville Peltonen (HIFK)

1993-94: Juha Lind (Jokerit)

1994-95: Joni Lehto (Lukko)

1995-96: Jani Hurme (TPS)

1996-97: Olli Jokinen (HIFK)

1997-98: Pasi Puistola (Ilves)

1998-99: Timo Pärssinen (HPK)

1999-00: Antero Niittymäki (TPS)

2000-01: Toni Dahlman (Ilves)

2001-02: Joonas Vihko (HIFK)

2002-03: Toni Söderholm (HIFK)

2003-04: Janne Pesonen (Kärpät)

2004-05: Simo Vidgren (Ilves)

2005-06: Perttu Lindgren (Ilves)

2006-07: Tuomas Suominen (TPS)

2007-08: Oskar Osala (Blues)

2008-09: Teemu Hartikainen (KalPa)

2009-10: Mikael Granlund (HIFK)

2010-11: Teemu Pulkkinen (Jokerit)

2011-12: Teuvo Teräväinen (Jokerit)

2012-13: Artturi Lehkonen (KalPa)

2013-14: Juuse Saros (HPK)

2014-15: Otso Rantakari (Blues)

2015-16: Patrik Laine (Tappara)

2016-17: Otto Koivula (Ilves)

2017-18: Petrus Palmu (TPS)

2018-19: Kaapo Kakko (TPS)

2019–20: Matias Maccelli (Ilves)

2020–21: Kasper Björkqvist (KooKoo)

2021-22: Joakim Kemell (JYP)

Source:

References

Liiga trophies and awards